Kyai Gede Mosque, officially known as the Jami Mosque of Kotawaringin, is a mosque located in West Kotawaringin Regency, Central Kalimantan, Indonesia.

History
Kyai Gede Mosque (also spelled Kiai Gede, or Kiyai Gede) was established around 1675. The name Kyai Gede (Javanese for "great kyai") refers to the name of a kyai who had left the Demak Sultanate in Java after a conflict with the Sultan of Demak. He reached the Sultanate of Banjar in the southern part of Kalimantan where he was told by the ruling Sultan, Mustain Billah, to expand the Sultanate of Banjar to the west.

Kyai Gede began his voyage through the upstream of Lamandau River. He arrived in a settlement in what is now the town of Kotawaringin. The small settlement was led by the seven brothers of Demang. With the help of the locals, Kyai Gede managed to solve the problem of the townspeople, and following that he settled in the area to teach Islam. Later, it was recorded that Kyai Gede, together with Prince Adipati Antakesuma decided to establish a Sultanate in Kotawaringin. Together they establish a kraton/palace as well as a mosque for the new kingdom. This mosque was assumed to be established after 1675, the year Pangeran Antakusuma became the new leader of his own kingdom. Because of Kyai Gede's great services in spreading Islam as well as establishing the Sultanate of Kotawaringin, Sultan Mustain Billah entitled him the regent (adipati) of Kotawaringin under the title Patih Hamengubumi and Adipati Gede Ing Kotawaringing.

In 1951, Kyai Gede Mosque was restored with the help of funding by the people surrounding the area. A new terrace was added, and the roof shingles were restored. In 1968, the minbar was restored by adding a roof over the outward protruding minbar. Today, however, the addition has been removed to restore the appearance of the mosque to its original form. In 1980–1981, the river bank of Lamandau River was paved to protect the mosque. Another series of restorations of the mosque was done in 1982-1983 and 1985–1986.

Today, the Kyai Gede Mosque still stands firm and well-maintained. Maintenance of the mosque was done by the people of the Kotawaringin town. The mosque is still used as a place of worship and as a place for Islamic learning in the area.

Architecture
The Kyai Gede Mosque was built in the Banjarese variation of the Javanese mosque architecture. The architectural style of the Banjarese mosque shares similarities with the mosques of the Demak sultanates, especially the Great Mosque of Demak. During the course of history, the Banjar develops its own architectural style. One of the main characteristics of Banjarese mosque is the three- or five-tiered roof with a steep top roof, compared to the relatively low-angled roof of Javanese mosque. Another characteristic is the absence of serambi (roofed porch), a traditional feature in Javanese mosques. The Banjarese mosque style is similar with the mosques of West Sumatra and are possibly related to other examples from peninsular Malaysia.

Kyai Gede Mosque was constructed out of ulin wood, a type of hardwood which was used for building construction across the Indonesian archipelago. The ulin wood is applied to all parts of the mosque, including the floor, walls, roof frames, and roof shingles. The mosque proper is square shaped about 15.5 x 15.5 meter. The mosque stood on a  wooden platform. The Kyai Gede Mosque is built with three tiers of wooden pyramidal roofs supported by four saka guru main posts. The uppermost tier of roof is steeper than the lower roof tiers. The roof of the mosque contains foliage-like finials at the corner of the roofs and on top of the uppermost roof. The wooden posts of the mosque stand over a wooden base instead of set up into the ground.

References

Cited works 
 

Mosques in Indonesia
Javanese culture
Cultural Properties of Indonesia
Central Kalimantan